Northern Lincolnshire describes the northern part of the ceremonial county of Lincolnshire. 

For local administration, there are two unitary authorities—North Lincolnshire and North East Lincolnshire—which are separate from Lincolnshire County Council. These two areas were previously part of the county of Humberside, which was created from the historic Parts of Lindsey in Lincolnshire in 1974. Humberside was abolished in 1996 and the two new unitary authorities were established and the area was returned to Lincolnshire for lieutenancy purposes.

Northern Lincolnshire is often used by organisations and in the news to refer to the two areas.

See also
 North Lincolnshire
 North East Lincolnshire
 Northern Lincolnshire and Goole Hospitals NHS Foundation Trust
 Humberside
 South Humberside
 North Lincolnshire (UK Parliament constituency)

References

Humberside
Borough of North Lincolnshire
Borough of North East Lincolnshire
Lincolnshire